This is a list of the National Register of Historic Places listings in Falls County, Texas.

This is intended to be a complete list of properties and districts listed on the National Register of Historic Places in Falls County, Texas. There are one district and one individual property listed on the National Register in the county. The individually listed property is also a State Antiquities Landmark and a Recorded Texas Historic Landmark while the district contains an additional Recorded Texas Historic Landmark.

Current listings

The locations of National Register properties and districts may be seen in a mapping service provided.

|}

See also

National Register of Historic Places listings in Texas
Recorded Texas Historic Landmarks in Falls County

References

External links

Falls County, Texas
Falls County
Buildings and structures in Falls County, Texas